, commonly called to as EleSys, is a Japanese corporation with a  headoffice in Sakuradai Nerima, Tokyo, Japan.

The company is one of the leading companies of one-top services for electronic design or products mostly in the non-consumer or professional markets.
Also it sells and develops software for CAD, interface (USB or WiFi) or simulator.

History
 Founded in April, 1981
 Established in May, 1983
 Approved as a Green Partner of Sony Corporation in 2006

Services and Operation
 Provision of total (one stop) services or each (one) of "System Design" "PCB Design" "Mount/Assy" "Test/Adjust"
in the category of electronics
 Development of application software including interface system such as USB or WiFi
 Sales and development of CAD software such as PCB or schematics and simulator such as high frequency analysis

Developments

Visual Equipment
 LCD Projector
 Peripheral System of C-MOS Image Sensor
 HDTV Video Conversion Device
 Multi Scan Converter
 Video Writer for Broadcaster

Industrial Equipment
 Hydrometer
 Spring Tester
 Tensile Strength Tester
 Distortion Rate Measuring Equipment
 Image Tracking Equipment

Other Equipment
 Evaluation System for LSI
 Air Conditioning Control Equipment
 Professional Wireless Microphone Unit

Main Products for Sale 
esCAD pcb - PCB Pattern Design CAD (Free of Charge until 31-Dec-2015)
esCAD sch - Circuit Diagram Drawing CAD (Freeware, only in Japanese at present)
PCB Mounting Assist Tool
Transmission Line Simulator - High Frequency Transmission Line Analysis

References

External links
 

Japanese companies established in 1983
Manufacturing companies based in Tokyo
Electronic design automation companies
Manufacturers of professional audio equipment
Display technology companies
Audio equipment manufacturers of Japan
Japanese brands
Electronics companies established in 1983